The Kwa Ibo River (also Quaibo River) is a river that rises near Umuahia in Abia State, Nigeria, and flows in a southeastern direction through Akwa Ibom State to the Atlantic Ocean.

The river feeds a zone of mangrove swamps linked by creeks and lagoons that is separated from the sea by a low and narrow ridge of sand.

References

Abia State
Rivers of Nigeria